Filip Jers (born November 7, 1986 in south of Sweden) is a Swedish harmonica player and composer.

Filip Jers gained recognition after winning the World Harmonica Festival in Trossingen (2005).

He received the 2003 Musik Direkt jazzprize, 2003 Åmåls Junior Blues Prize, 2004 Danish Munspelsmästerskapen 1st prize, 2004 Musik Direkt Jeunesses Musicales International International prize, 2004 Höörs Community Cultureprize, 2005 World Harmonica Championships 1:a prize, 2006 Sundsgården Musicianscholarship, 2006 Lions Musicscholarship Höör, 2009 Royal College of Music Studentgrant, 2010 SWEJS Göteborg Jazz Scholarship, 2010 Harry Arnolds Jazz Standy-By Prize, 2010 Kungliga Musikaliska Akademien Jazzgrant and receiving the Alice Babs Jazz scholarship in 2012.

Filip Jers was the first harmonica student to be accepted and receive a diploma in harmonica by the Royal College of Music in Stockholm. He plays often as a guest soloist but also as a permanent member in Stockholm Lisboa Project, Primus Motor and Filip Jers Quartet.

Discography 
Diagonal, 2009 with Stockholm Lisboa Project
Åka med, 2012 with Primus Motor
Spiro, 2011, Solo CD

External links 
Official home page

References

Living people
Swedish harmonica players
1986 births